Iranshahr University of Medical Sciences is a medical sciences university in Iranshahr, Sistan and Baluchestan, Iran. The university has three school including medicine, medical emergency, and nursing & midwifery.

References

External links
Official website

Iranshahr County
Medical schools in Iran